Mark Twain's 1881 novel The Prince and the Pauper has been adapted for the screen and television a number of times:

Film

Direct or faithful adaptations 
The Prince and the Pauper (1909), a two-reel short that features some of the only known film footage of Mark Twain, shot by Thomas Edison at Twain's Connecticut home, starring Cecil Spooner as Edward VI and Tom Canty.
The Prince and the Pauper (1915 film), directed by Hugh Ford and Edwin Stanton Porter; the first feature-length adaptation starring  Marguerite Clark as Edward VI and Tom Canty.
 The Prince and the Pauper (1920 film) (German: Prinz und Bettelknabe), a 1920 Austrian film directed by Alexander Korda and starring Tibor Lubinszky as Edward VI and Tom Canty
The Prince and the Pauper (1937 film), featuring Errol Flynn as Miles Hendon and Billy and Bobby Mauch as the title characters.
  The Prince and the Pauper (1977 film), starring Oliver Reed, Raquel Welch, Ernest Borgnine, George C. Scott, Rex Harrison, and Charlton Heston; released in the US as Crossed Swords
The Prince and the Pauper (2000), a television film directed by Giles Foster and starring Aidan Quinn as Miles Hendon, Alan Bates, Jonathan Hyde, and Jonathan and Robert Timmins as the title characters.

Loose translations, pastiches, and parodies 
Raju Peda (1954), a Telugu-version adaptation of the novel produced for Indian television
 Raja Aur Runk (1968), a Bollywood film directed by Kotayya Pratyagatma, the film "Indianizes" many of the episodes in the original story. This film is a big-screen remake of Raju Peda.
 Ringo (1978), TV special starring Ringo Starr, involving the former Beatles drummer trading places with his (fictional) talentless look-alike half-brother
The Prince and the Pauper (1990 film), an animated featurette starring Mickey Mouse
 Class Act, an urban re-telling starring Kid 'n Play
 It Takes Two (1995), starring twins Mary-Kate and Ashley Olsen, in which two girls (one wealthy and the other an orphan, who resemble each other) switch places in order to experience each other's lives.
 The Prince and the Pauper (1995 film), an animated film adaptation of two boys (one being called Tom Canty & the other Prince Edward) from different backgrounds who are exactly identical. The film uses elements from the 1991 film Beauty & the Beast (1991 film) with talking/singing objects who aide Tom in finding the real Prince all the while protecting his identity while Edward is aided by Myles Hendon.
 Tere Mere Sapne (1996), a Bollywood film in which two boys born on exactly the same date switch places to experience the other's life, whilst learning valuable lessons along the way
 Barbie as the Princess and the Pauper (2004), an 85-minute CGI-animated musical, with Barbie playing the blond Princess Anneliese and the brunette pauper Erika
 Garfield: A Tail of Two Kitties (2006), Garfield's second live-action film
The Prince and the Pauper: Double Trouble (2007), a direct-to-video CGI animated film produced by BKN International
A Modern Twain Story: The Prince and the Pauper (2007), starring Dylan and Cole Sprouse
 Barbie: The Princess and the Popstar (2012), a CGI musical adaptation in which Barbie plays a blonde princess named Victoria (Tori) and a brunette popstar named Keira. Both crave the life of another, and one day they meet and magically change places.
Monte Carlo (2011): Starring Selena Gomez.
Open Season 3 (2011): parts of the movie is a parody.
The Princess Switch (2018) . A Netflix adaptation starring Vanessa Hudgens.
Curious George: Royal Monkey (2019) a direct-to-video animated film about George gets mistaken by a prince named Prince Philippe.
Barbie Princess Adventure (2020), a CGI musical adaption in which Barbie plays a blogger who is invited on a 'foreign exchange trip' by Princess Amelia, who realises they look alike after watching one of Barbie's music videos, and intends for them to switch places.

Television

Direct or faithful adaptations 
 DuPont Show of the Month (1957), single-episode adaptation with Johnny Washbrook as Tom Canty and Rex Thompson as Prince Edward
 The Prince and the Pauper (1962), produced by Walt Disney Productions for Walt Disney's Wonderful World of Color, a three-part adaptation filmed in Shepperton, England, featuring Guy Williams as Miles Hendon. Both Prince Edward and Tom Canty were played by Sean Scully, using an early version of the split-screen technique which the Disney studios use in the 1961 film The Parent Trap.
 The Prince and the Pauper (1976), BBC television adaptation by writer Richard Harris, consisting of six thirty-minute episodes, with Nicholas Lyndhurst in the starring role
 The Prince and the Pauper (1976), a six-part episode of the PBS series Once Upon a Classic
 The Prince and the Pauper (1996 TV series), a six-part BBC series starring James Purefoy, with Keith Michell reprising his role of Henry VIII, and screenplay by Julian Fellowes
 The Princess & the Pauper (2000), from the 1995 original HBO Family animated series Happily Ever After: Fairy Tales for Every Child depicting a feminist twist with two African-American girls named Zoe & Princess Olivia, both played by Raven-Symoné.

Rough translations, pastiches, and parodies 
 "The Prince and the Paupers" (1967), the 21st episode of The Monkees
 "P.J. and the President's Son" (1976), a modern American-based ABC Afterschool Special with Lance Kerwin playing the dual role
 "Duel and Duality" (1987), an episode of Blackadder the Third where the Prince Regent believes that the Duke of Wellington is after him. The prince swaps clothes with Blackadder (his butler) and says, "This reminds me of that story 'The Prince and the Porpoise'." Blackadder corrects him: "Pauper. The Prince and the Pauper."
 "The Prince and the Pooch" (1996), an episode of Wishbone with Wishbone playing both Tom Canty and Edward VI
"Double, Double, Boy in Trouble" (2008), an episode of The Simpsons
Jake & Blake (2010), an Argentine television series which started out as a parody of The Prince and the Pauper, but turned to a more serious plotline as the show progressed
 "Princess for a Day" (2011), an episode of Olivia (season 2, episode 4) with Olivia portrays the upper class Princess Anneliese and Stephanie portrays the lower class pauper Erika who switch places for a while.
 "Make Play" (2011), an episode of Phineas and Ferb (season 2, episode 64), with Candace switching places with Princess Baldegunde of Duselstein and discovering that royal life is dull
 "The Princess and the Pickpocket" (2017), an episode of the anime series Princess Principal. The characters Ange and Princess Charlotte have their history revealed by Ange under the guise of a fairy tale. Ten years prior to the start of the series, Ange, who was actually the real Princess Charlotte, met Princess, who was actually a common pickpocket named Ange and looked identical to her. They befriended one another and eventually decided to trade places for a day. Soon after the switch, however, a revolution broke out and divided their country, separating the girls and leaving them trapped in each other's roles.

See also
 Cultural depictions of Edward VI of England
 Trading Places, a 1983 comedy that draws heavily on the plot outline for The Prince and the Pauper

References

Cultural depictions of Edward VI of England